Poleramma is a Hindu goddess of plague and smallpox. She is predominantly worshipped in the villages of Andhra Pradesh, and is regarded as a regional consort of Shiva.

Description
Poleramma is worshipped as a village goddess whose role is to server as the protector of the village. Her shrine is usually present outside the boundaries of the village, and often appears crudely built with mud and stones. She is considered a goddess of smallpox, and is associated with the goddess Mariamman of Tamil Nadu. She is regarded to oversee cattle disease, drought, and general health welfare. According to Yanadi tradition, the goddess causes smallpox to her adherents when she is not offered veneration. She is venerated by the community on a fixed day in a special hut after they are cured of the disease.

Legend 
Poleramma is regarded to be one of the seven sister-goddesses worshipped by adherents in rural Andhra Pradesh, having a brother named Pothuraju.

Festival 
A festival is dedicated to Poleramma, lasting three days. A buffalo is sacrificed as an offering to the goddess, its blood poured into a pot and ritually scattered around the village.

References

Hindu goddesses
Hindu folk deities